Roy Travis Pugh (October 19, 1922 – August 3, 2006) was an American professional basketball player. Pugh was selected in the 1948 BAA Draft by the Philadelphia Warriors. In 1948–49, he played in the National Basketball League for the Indianapolis Kautskys before moving to the Basketball Association of America. In just one season in the BAA, Pugh played for the Indianapolis Jets, Fort Wayne Pistons, and Philadelphia Warriors. Pugh played college basketball for the SMU Mustangs.

BAA career statistics

Regular season

References

External links

1922 births
2006 deaths
American men's basketball players
Basketball players from Texas
Centers (basketball)
Fort Wayne Pistons players
Forwards (basketball)
Indianapolis Jets players
Indianapolis Kautskys players
People from Jacksonville, Texas
Philadelphia Warriors draft picks
Philadelphia Warriors players
SMU Mustangs men's basketball players